Maynard v. West Midlands Regional Health Authority [1985] 1 All ER 635 is an English tort law case concerning the Bolam test for professional negligence.

The patient presented with symptoms of tuberculosis but both the consultant physician and the consultant surgeon took the view that Hodgkin's disease, carcinoma, and sarcoidosis were also possibilities, the first of which if present would have required remedial steps to be taken in its early stages. Instead of waiting for the results of the sputum tests, the consultants carried out a mediastinoscopy to get a biopsy. The inherent risk of damage was to the left laryngeal recurrent nerve, even if the operation was properly done. In the event, only tuberculosis was confirmed. Unfortunately, the risk became a reality and the patient suffered a paralysis of the left vocal cord. The decision of the physician and the surgeon to proceed was said by their expert peers to be reasonable in all the circumstances.

See also
Negligence

Notes

English tort case law
1985 in case law
1985 in British law